Václav Hovorka (19 September 1931 – 14 October 1996) was a Czechoslovak football forward who played for Czechoslovakia in the 1958 FIFA World Cup. He also played for SK Slavia Prague. Hovorka died on 14 October 1996, at the age of 65.

References

External links
 Profile at the ČMFS website
 

1931 births
1996 deaths
1958 FIFA World Cup players
Association football forwards
Czech footballers
Czechoslovak footballers
Czechoslovakia international footballers
SK Slavia Prague players